The Legacy of a Whitetail Deer Hunter is a 2018 American comedy-drama film directed by Jody Hill and written by Hill, John Carcieri, and Danny McBride. The film stars Josh Brolin, Montana Jordan, and McBride.

The Legacy of a Whitetail Deer Hunter premiered at the 2018 South by Southwest festival and was later released worldwide on July 6, 2018 by Netflix.

Premise
The great hunter Buck Ferguson and his trusted cameraman Don set out for an epic weekend adventure to reconnect with Buck's son Jaden.

Cast
 Josh Brolin as Buck Ferguson, Jaden’s father, Linda’s ex-husband and Don’s friend
 Montana Jordan as Jaden Ferguson, Linda and Buck’s son
 Danny McBride as Don, the trusted friend of Buck Ferguson
 Carrie Coon as Linda Ferguson, Buck’s ex-wife and Jaden’s mother
 Scoot McNairy as Greg, Linda's boyfriend

Production
In June 2015, it was announced Danny McBride and Josh Brolin would star in the film. In November 2015, it was reported that Montana Jordan was cast in the film. In January  2016, Scoot McNairy joined the cast.

Principal photography began in October 2015.

Reception
The website's critical consensus reads, "The Legacy of a Whitetail Deer Hunter wastes a promising premise and talented cast on a frustratingly uneven comedy that lacks enough laughs to forgive its narrative flaws." On Metacritic, the film has a weighted average score of 52 out of 100, based on 10 critics, indicating "mixed or average reviews".

References

External links
 

2018 films
2018 comedy films
2018 comedy-drama films
American comedy-drama films
Films about hunters
Films directed by Jody Hill
Films produced by Scott Rudin
Films shot in North Carolina
English-language Netflix original films
2010s English-language films
2010s American films